This is a list of people from, or associated with Northallerton, a town in North Yorkshire, England. This list is arranged alphabetically by surname:



A 
Kitty Anderson (1903–1979), a schoolteacher, she lived her last years and died in Northallerton.

B 
Jessica Barden, actor born in Northallerton
Thomas Burnet, born at Croft, educated at Northallerton

C 
Karl Carver, Cricketer

D 
Andy Dawson, footballer born in Northallerton, played for Nottingham Forest and Scunthorpe United
Kevin Dawson, footballer born in Northallerton, played for Nottingham Forest and Barnet
Michael Dawson, footballer who has played for Hull City, Sheffield Wednesday, and Tottenham Hotspur.
Carla Devlin, olympic rower born in Northallerton
Alfred Cardew Dixon, mathematician

F 
John Fisher, was vicar of Northallerton in the 1490s

G 
Edmund Gheast (1514–1577), church of England bishop

H 
George Hickes, Dean of Worcester cathedral, born in Kirkby Wiske, educated in Northallerton
Alan Richard Hill, Victoria Cross recipient
Alan Hinkes, mountaineer, is the only person in the world to have conquered the world's 14 highest peaks
Dan Hodgson, cricketer born in Northallerton

J 
Joanne Jackson, swimmer

K 
John Kettlewell (1653–1685), clergyman and theological writer

L 
Henry Lascelles (1690–1753), MP and plantation owner
Scott Lincoln, shot put champion

R 
John Radcliffe (1652–1714), founder of Oxford's John Radcliffe Hospital and physician to William of Orange. Educated at Northallerton.
Graham Rennison, footballer born in Northallerton
Thomas Rymer, born at Appleton Wiske, educated in Northallerton

S 
Bobby Scaife, footballer born in Northallerton
Marc Scott, runner
Jodi Ewart Shadoff, golfer born in Northallerton
Dorothy E. Smith, ethnographer, born in Northallerton

T 
Andy Toman, footballer born in Northallerton

W 
Sidney Weighell (1923–2002), former general secretary of the NUR
Laurence Whiteley, born in Scarborough, but lives in Northallerton
Dave Wintersgill, footballer born in Northallerton

References

Sources 

Northallerton